The DANICE submarine communications cable system transits 2250 km of the North Atlantic Ocean and the North Sea to connect Iceland and Denmark. It consists of four fibre pairs, capable of carrying in total up to 36.4 Tbit/s of data using 100Gbit/s coherent wavelength technology available in 2013. The cable went into operation in November 2009 and has had no submarine faults. The operator of the cable is Farice ehf.  The complementary cable is FARICE-1.  DANICE has cable landing points at:
Landeyjarsandur, Iceland
Blaabjerg, Denmark.

See also
FARICE-1
Greenland Connect
CANTAT-3

References

External links 

Submarine communications cables in the North Sea
Submarine communications cables in the North Atlantic Ocean
Transatlantic communications cables
Denmark–Iceland relations
2009 establishments in Denmark
2009 establishments in Iceland